Johnny Nguyen (born 6 March 1975) is an Australian former weightlifter. He competed in the men's flyweight event at the 1996 Summer Olympics.

References

External links
 

1975 births
Living people
Australian male weightlifters
Olympic weightlifters of Australia
Weightlifters at the 1996 Summer Olympics
Sportspeople from Ho Chi Minh City
20th-century Australian people
21st-century Australian people